Maja Bay Østergaard (born March 28, 1998) is a Danish soccer player who plays as a goalkeeper for FC Thy-Thisted Q in the Danish Women's League and the Denmark national team.

Career 
She was the winner of the  Danish Women's Cup with FC Thy-Thisted Q in 2020/2021. She was the runner up of the Danish Women's Cup with FC Thy-Thisted Q in 2021/2022 and 2019/2020. Østergaard received her first call up to the  Denmark national team in March 2022.

External links 

 Maja Bay Østergaard player profile in DBU's National Team database 
 Maja Bay Østergaard profile on WorldFootball.net 
 Maja Bay Østergaard player profile on Soccerdonna.de
 Maja Bay Østergaard player profile on Soccerway

References 

1998 births
Living people
Danish women's footballers
Denmark women's youth international footballers
Denmark international footballers
Association football goalkeepers
Women's association football goalkeepers

FC Thy-Thisted Q players